is a Japanese voice actress, J-pop singer and stage actress. She sang the ending theme song of the PlayStation 2 role-playing video game Shadow Hearts, titled Ending Theme ~ Shadow Hearts, and the ending theme of the PC and PlayStation 2 visual novel Ever 17: The Out of Infinity, titled Aqua Stripe.

Filmography

Television animation
 Katue Pearson in Ginga Hyōryū Vifam (1983)
 Coco in Anpanman (1988)
 Princess Camille in Little Nemo: Adventures in Slumberland (1989)
 Mint in Magical Angel Sweet Mint (1990)
 Nanako Misonou in Oniisama e (1991)
 Fuu Hououji in Magic Knight Rayearth (1994)
 Hazuki Kōyama in Full Moon o Sagashite (2002)

Unknown 

 Oniyuri Kageyama in Hyakko
 Sayo Amakusa / Magdalia in Rurouni Kenshin
 Azalyn in Irresponsible Captain Tylor
 Naomi Armitage in Armitage III (original)
 Ishtar in The Super Dimension Fortress Macross II: Lovers, Again
 Laura Sullivan in Dancouga – God Bless Dancouga
 Chris Parton in Burning Rangers
 Hitomi Kasahara in Shinesman
 Sunako's Mother in The Wallflower
 Arieta Lyuis in Growlanser II: The Sense of Justice
 Sora Akanegasaki in Ever17 -the out of infinity-
 Phorni in Symphonic Rain
 Jessica in Kurau Phantom Memory
 Princess Rose in Yu-Gi-Oh! Duel Monsters GX
 Koudelka Iasant in Shadow Hearts
 Sakura Tomoe in Weiss Kreuz
 Ami in DNA²
 Retsu Unohana in Rock Musical BLEACH
 Kachua Pearson in Vifam (her first voice acting role, at age 13)
 Senri's Mother in Vampire Knight
 Sango Otojima in Kyūkyoku Chōjin R
 Princess Mariel in Yami to Bōshi to Hon no Tabibito
 Maron Namikaze in Assemble Insert

External links 

Hiroko Kasahara at Hitoshi Doi's seiyuu page

1970 births
Actresses from Tokyo
Japanese voice actresses
Living people
People from Niigata Prefecture
Singers from Tokyo
Anime musicians
21st-century Japanese singers